Nitesh Tiwari is an Indian film director, screenwriter, and lyricist known for his works in Bollywood. He debuted as a co-director in Chillar Party (2011) which won the National Film Award for Best Children's Film. He also directed the supernatural political drama Bhoothnath Returns (2014).

Tiwari scripted and directed the highest-grossing Indian film, Dangal (2016), which was screened at the Beijing International Film Festival and the second BRICS festival in 2017. The film is the highest-grossing Indian film and the fifth highest grossing non-English film, earning over  including 1,200 crore in China, where it has emerged as one of the top 20 highest-grossers of all time. Tiwari won the Filmfare Award for Best Director at the 62nd Filmfare Awards and the Telstra People's Choice Award at the 2017 Indian Film Festival of Melbourne. He followed up with the critically acclaimed comedy-drama film Chhichhore (2019).

He has also co-founded Earthsky Pictures, producing ad films and the docu-series Break Point based on Indian tennis legends Mahesh Bhupathi and Leander Paes.

Early life
Tiwari was born in Madhya Pradesh to B. D. Tiwari. He has a brother and a sister. He graduated from the Indian Institute of Technology Bombay in 1996 with a bachelor's degree in Metallurgy and Material Science engineering. He worked as a creative director at Leo Burnett before entering Bollywood. Tiwari grew up in the small town of Ganj Basoda, attending Bharat Mata Convent School until class 8th. He performed in a school play titled "Tapori-Mughal-e-Azam".

Personal life
Tiwari is married to Ashwiny Iyer Tiwari, a former colleague and creative director at Leo Burnett who is also a film director, producer, and writer. He is a father to twins, a boy and a girl.

Public image
Tiwari has also appreciated the work of other directors and found the Tamil film Varisu to be heart-warming.

Filmography

Awards and nominations

References

External links 
 

Hindi-language film directors
Film directors from Madhya Pradesh
Telstra People's Choice Award winners
Place of birth missing (living people)
Living people
21st-century Indian film directors
People from Hoshangabad
Screen Awards winners
Best Original Screenplay National Film Award winners
Directors who won the Best Children's Film National Film Award
IIT Bombay alumni
1972 births